Clydach-on-Tawe railway station served the community of Clydach and Ynystawe in Swansea, Wales from 1885 to 1965 on the Swansea Vale Railway.

History 
The station was opened in 1885 by the Midland Railway. The station was situated off Clydach Road. The station was renamed Clydach-on-Tawe South in early 1950 before being closed to passengers on 25 September 1950 and completely on 4 October 1965. The site is now part of the Players Industrial Estate with the old station building in use as an office but the rest of the site is now occupied by industrial.

References

External links 

Disused railway stations in Swansea
Former Midland Railway stations
Railway stations in Great Britain opened in 1885
Railway stations in Great Britain closed in 1950
1881 establishments in Wales
1965 disestablishments in Wales